The 1939–40 Georgetown Hoyas men's basketball team represented Georgetown University during the 1939–40 NCAA college basketball season. Elmer Ripley coached it in his fourth of ten seasons as head coach; it was also the second season of his second of three stints at the helm. The team played its home games at Tech Gymnasium on the campus of McKinley Technical High School in Washington, D.C. The team finished with a record of 8-10 and had no postseason play.

Season recap
Following the demise of the Eastern Intercollegiate Conference after the end of the previous season, Georgetown returned to an independent status. Beginning this season – its first as an independent since 1931-32 – it would play 38 seasons as an independent before becoming a founding member of the original Big East Conference in the 1979-1980 season.

The 1939–40 Hoyas were a young team, with only two seniors on the roster. New to the team was sophomore guard Buddy O'Grady. He averaged 4.9 points per game for the season and became a leader on the court, and would be a star for the Hoyas for three seasons.

The team became a part of television broadcasting history on February 28, 1940, when television station W2XBS broadcast a men's basketball doubleheader from Madison Square Garden in New York City. Fordham and Pittsburgh played in the first game, and New York University played Georgetown in the second game. It was the first time in history that college basketball was televised.

The 1939–40 Hoyas had a difficult season, finishing with an 8-10 record and no post-season play. Senior forward Al Lujack went on to play professionally for one season with the Washington Capitals of the Basketball Association of America.

Roster
Sources

Sophomore guard Buddy O'Grady would later serve as the Hoyas' head coach from 1949 to 1952.

Sophomore guard Don Martin served as head coach at Boston College from 1953 to 1962.

Senior guard Francis "Reds" Daly was killed in action in the Battle of Iwo Jima on February 22, 1945, during World War II military service.

1939–40 schedule and results
Sources

|-
!colspan=9 style="background:#002147; color:#8D817B;"| Regular Season

References

Georgetown Hoyas men's basketball seasons
Georgetown
Georgetown Hoyas men's basketball team
Georgetown Hoyas men's basketball team